VDN may refer to:

 Vin doux naturel, a type of wine
 Vadgaon railway station, on the Mumbai–Chennai line in India
 La Voix du Nord (daily), a French newspaper
 Vector directory number in telephony